was a Japanese sprinter. He competed in the men's 400 metres at the 1932 Summer Olympics.

References

External links
 

1914 births
Year of death missing
Japanese male sprinters
Olympic male sprinters
Olympic athletes of Japan
Athletes (track and field) at the 1932 Summer Olympics
Japan Championships in Athletics winners
20th-century Japanese people